Xuejiawan is a town and the Banner seat of Jungar Banner, Ordos City, in the Inner Mongolia Autonomous Region, People's Republic of China. It has an area of 1345.097 square kilometers and a population of 165,000.

References

Township-level divisions of Inner Mongolia
Ordos City
Towns in China